Sangli railway station serves the city of Sangli in Maharashtra, India. It is a class A station under Pune railway division of Central Railway Zone of Indian Railways.

It is located at 558 m above sea level and has three platforms. As of 2020, double electric broad-gauge railway line exist. At this station, 46 trains stop, one train originates and one train terminates. Pune Airport, is at distance of 200 kilometres.

For those going to Pandharpur, Solapur, Latur, Hyderabad, Tirupati there are trains from Sangli to Miraj Junction where people can change trains

Recently, GM Central Railway has in principle approved PIT line at Sangli station which will allow the railway department to run Sangli–Kolhapur DEMU Local trains at least 7–8 times in a day. This will increase connectivity of Sangli and Kolhapur. Also PIT line will enable to start Sangli–Pandharpur, Sangli–Solapur, Sangli–Kurduvadi, Sangli–Belgaum, Sangli–Londa and Sangli–Vasco trains. 

Before 1971, Sangli was the terminus of the Miraj–Sangli narrow-gauge line. The station was located in the heart of Sangli city. After gauge conversion in 1971, this branch line was closed and Sangli brought on Miraj–Pune main line. The old station was abandoned and demolished somewhere in 2003.
Railway department done lot of development in Sangli station like coach display units, paving blocks surface on platforms. There is strong demand from railway passenger forum of Belgaum and Sangli district for extension of Mysuru–Dharwar Express up to Sangli for better convenience of the people of north Karnataka and South Maharashtra. Railway state minister Hon.Mr.Angadi is given approval for the extension. After completion of electrification and doubling of Pune–Sangli–Miraj–Bangalore line, Sangli will become very important station on this route.

References

Pune railway division
Railway stations in Sangli district